Rohat Ağca (born 3 September 2001) is a Dutch professional football player who plays as a midfielder for German fifth-tier Oberliga Westfalen club SpVgg Vreden.

Club career
A youth product of Twente's youth academy since the age of 11, Agca signed a professional contract with Heracles Almelo on 1 September 2020.

References

External links

2001 births
Living people
Sportspeople from Almelo
Footballers from Overijssel
Dutch footballers
Dutch people of Turkish descent
Association football midfielders
FC Twente players
Heracles Almelo players
Eredivisie players
Dutch expatriate footballers
Expatriate footballers in Germany
Dutch expatriate sportspeople in Germany